Stephen A. Webb (born 28 November 1958) is a social theorist and researcher in social work, social welfare and policy. He was born in Margate Kent, in 1958, the son of Mary and Philip Webb and has a younger brother Richard and sister Nicola Webb. He attended Heath Junior School, Chesterfield Boys Grammar School and University of Oxford. 

He is presently Professor of Social Work at Glasgow Caledonian University in Scotland and Assistant Vice Principal for Community and Public Engagement. In 2018 he was awarded to prestigious Fellowship of the Academy of Social Sciences (FAcSS) which is an award granted by the Academy of Social Sciences to leading academics, policy-makers, and practitioners of the social sciences. Previously he was Professor of Human Sciences and Director of the Research Institute for Social Inclusion and Wellbeing, University of Newcastle, New South Wales, Australia, and Professorial Fellow at the University of Sussex. Prior to this he was Reader at University of Sussex. He has held visiting Professorships in Netherlands, Germany, Portugal and Lithuania and was awarded a DAAD Visiting Professorship at the Bielefeld University, Germany. Stephen was awarded the prestigious Fellowship of the Academy of Social Sciences (FAcSS) in 2018.

He is author of several highly cited books including Social Work in a Risk Society (Palgrave, 2006) and Evidence-based Social Work: A Critical Stance (with Gray & Plath, Routledge, 2009). He is co-editor (with Gray) of Social Work Theories and Methods (Sage, 2008), the four-volume international reference work International Social Work (Sage, 2010), Ethics and Value Perspectives in Social Work (Palgrave, 2010). He  has completed (with Gray and Midgley) The Handbook of Social Work for Sage, which is the world's first major international reference work in this field. Webb’s critical analysis, Some considerations on the validity of evidence-based practice in social work, is the world’s most highly cited article in the field and the most influential publication in social work over the last ten years. His highly acclaimed The New Politics of Critical Social Work was published in 2013 for Palgrave and the second edition of Social Work Theories and Methods for Sage, London, has been translated into Korean and Polish.

Publications

Authored books

Edited books

References 

Academic staff of the University of Newcastle (Australia)
Living people
1956 births
People educated at Chesterfield Grammar School
Academics of Glasgow Caledonian University
Social work scholars